Chen Ji (born 5 January 1997) is a Chinese footballer who currently plays for Hubei Istar.

Club career
Chen Ji joined Chinese Super League side Jiangsu Sainty's youth academy in 2014 after his unsuccessful trial in Portugal. He was promoted to the first team squad in the summer of 2016 by manager Choi Yong-soo. On 29 April 2017, he made his senior debut in a 2–2 away defeat against Tianjin Quanjian as the benefit of the new rule of the league that at least one Under-23 player must be in the starting line-up and was substituted off in the 15th minute. He scored his first senior goal in his second appearance on 2 May 2017 in the 2017 Chinese FA Cup as Jiangsu beat League Two side Jiangxi Liansheng 1–0.

On 26 February 2018, Chen was loaned to fellow Super League side Guizhou Hengfeng until 31 December 2018. On 11 March 2019, he made his debut for the club in a 3–2 home loss against Hebei China Fortune. He made 20 league appearances in the 2018 season as Guizhou Hengfeng eventually finished the bottom of the league and relegated to the China League One. Chen made a permanent transfer to Guizhou Zhicheng in February 2019.

Career statistics 
Statistics accurate as of match played 31 December 2020.

References

External links
 

1997 births
Living people
Chinese footballers
Association football midfielders
Footballers from Wuhan
Jiangsu F.C. players
Guizhou F.C. players
Chinese Super League players
China League One players
21st-century Chinese people